Methylguanine may refer to:

 1-Methylguanine
 2-Methylguanine
 3-Methylguanine
 6-O-Methylguanine
 7-Methylguanine